Mirificarma mulinella is a moth of the family Gelechiidae. It is found in most of Europe, except Finland, the Baltic region and part of the Balkan Peninsula. It has also been recorded from North Africa.

The wingspan is 6–7.5 mm for males and 5.5–7.5 mm for females. The head is cream to light brown. The forewings are mottled brown, mixed with cream or light brown in the apical third and occasionally also in the posterior third. Adults are on wing from July to November in Europe, but have also been recorded in February in North Africa.

The larvae feed on Ulex europaeus, Cytisus scoparius, Cytisus nigricans, Genista germanica, Lupinus arboreus and Calicotome spinosa. On Ulex and Cytisus scoparius, they make a small hole in a bud that is not fully open and feed on the interior of the flower, before repeating the process in another flower. On Lupinus arboreus, the larvae feed on the leaves instead of the flowers. Larvae can be found from April to early May. Pupation takes place on the ground in a slight cocoon amongst leaves.

References

External links
 ukmoths

Moths described in 1839
Mirificarma
Moths of Africa
Moths of Europe